Nationality words link to articles with information on the nation's poetry or literature (for instance, Irish or France).

Events 
 Bloodaxe Books is established by Neil Astley in Newcastle upon Tyne, England
 L=A=N=G=U=A=G=E magazine, edited by Bruce Andrews and Charles Bernstein, is first published in the United States
 Stevie, a film based on a play about the poet Stevie Smith is released

Works published in English 
Listed by nation where the work was first published and again by the poet's native land, if different; substantially revised works listed separately:

Canada 
 Margaret Avison, Sunblue
 Earle Birney, Fall by Fury & Other Makings. Toronto: McClelland and Stewart.
 Dionne Brand, Fore Day Morning: Poems
 William Wilfred Campbell, Vapour and Blue: Souster selects Campbell. Raymond Souster ed. Paget Press.
 Leonard Cohen, Death of a Lady's Man
 Don Domanski, Heaven
 Phyllis Gotlieb, The Works: Collected Poems
 George Benson Johnston, Taking a Grip: Poems 1971-78.
 Irving Layton, The Love Poems of Irving Layton. Toronto: Canadian Fine Editions.
 Irving Layton, The Tightrope Dancer. Toronto: McClelland and Stewart.
 Dennis Lee, The Gods. Vancouver: Kanchenjunga Press.
 Pat MacKay, The Pat Lowther Poem
 Sean O'Huigin, The Inks and the Pencils and the Looking Back
 Michael Ondaatje, Elimination Dance/La danse eliminatoire, Ilderton: Nairn Coldstream; revised edition, Brick, 1980
 Craig Powell, Rehearsal for Dancers
 Al Purdy, Being Alive
 Joe Rosenblatt, Loosely Tied Hands. Black Moss.
 A.J.M. Smith The Classic Shade: Selected Poems
 Peter Trower, Bush Poems
 Sean Virgo, Deathwatch on Skidegate Narrows
 Miriam Waddington, Mister Never
 Wilfred Watson, I Begin With Counting
 George Woodcock:
 The Kestrel and Other Poems of Past and Present. Sunderland, Durham: Coelfrith Press, Canada
 Thomas Merton, Monk and Poet: A Critical Study, Vancouver: Douglas & McIntyre, and Seattle: University of Washington Press, criticism

India in English 
 K. R. Srinivasa Iyengar, Microcosmographia Poetica, Calcutta: Writers Workshop, India .
 Ketaki Kushari Dyson, Sap-wood, Calcutta: Writers Workshop, India.
 Margaret Chatterjee, The Sound of Wings, New Delhi: Arnold-Heinemann

Ireland 
 Seamus Heaney, After Summer, Gallery Press, Northern Ireland poet published in Dublin
 Thomas McCarthy, The First Convention, including "State Funeral" Dublin: Dolmen Press
 Tom Paulin, Personal Column, Northern Ireland poet published in the United Kingdom

New Zealand 
 Alan Brunton, Oh Ravachol, Red Mole

United Kingdom 
 Peter Ackroyd, Country Life
 Al Alvarez, Autumn to Autumn and Selected Poems 1953–1976
 Gillian Clarke, The Sundial, Welsh
 D. J. Enright, Paradise Illustrated
 Gavin Ewart, All My Little Ones (see also More Little Ones 1982)
 James Fenton, A Vacant Possession, poems, TNR Publications
 Roy Fisher, The Thing About Joe Sullivan
 Geoffrey Grigson, The Fiesta and Other Poems
 Tony Harrison, From the School of Eloquence, and Other Poems
 Seamus Heaney, After Summer, Gallery Press, Northern Ireland poet published in the United Kingdom
 John Heath-Stubbs, The Watchman's Flute
 Geoffrey Hill, Tenebrae, including the sonnet sequences "Lachrimae" and "An Apology for the Revival of Christian Architecture in England"
 Ted Hughes:
 Cave Birds
 Moon-Bells, and Other Poems, for children
 A. Norman Jeffares, W. B. Yeats: Man And Poet, United Kingdom, biography, revision of the first edition of 1948
 Jenny Joseph, The Thinking Heart
 Philip Larkin, Femmes Damnees
 Liz Lochhead, Islands
 George MacBeth, Buying a Heart (first published in the United States 1977)
 Hugh MacDiarmid, pen name of Christopher Murray Grieve (died September 9), Collected Poems 1920–1976, two volumes (posthumous)
 John Montague, The Great Cloak
 Andrew Motion, The Pleasure Steamers
 Norman Nicholson, The Shadow of Black Combe
 Tom Paulin, Personal Column, Northern Ireland poet published in the United Kingdom
 Craig Raine, The Onion, Memory
 Tom Rawling, A Sort of Killing
 Carol Rumens, A Necklace of Mirrors
 Jon Stallworthy, A Familiar Tree
 D. M. Thomas, The Honeymoon Voyage
 R. S. Thomas, Frequencies
 Jeffrey Wainwright, Heart's Desire

United States 
 Maya Angelou, And Still I Rise
 Paul Blackburn (died 1971), translator, Proensa: An Anthology of Troubadour Poetry
 Joseph Payne Brennan, As Evening Advances (Crystal Visions Press)
 Robert Creeley:
 Hello
 Later
 Ed Dorn:
 Hello, La Jolla, Wingbow Press, 
 Selected Poems, edited by Donald Allen, Grey Fox Press
 Cynthia Dubin Edelberg, Robert Creeley's Poetry: A Critical Introduction, Albuquerque, New Mexico (criticism)
 Nikki Giovanni, Cotton Candy on a Rainy Day
 John Hollander, Spectral Emanations
 bell hooks, And There We Wept: poems
 James McMichael, The Lover’s Familiar
 James Merrill, Mirabell: Books of Number
 W. S. Merwin, Feathers From the Hill, Iowa City, Iowa: Windhover
 Eugenio Montale, The Storm & Other Poems, translated by Charles Wright into English from the original Italian; Oberlin College Press, 
 Mary Oliver:
 The Night Traveler
 Twelve Moons
 George Oppen, Primitive (Black Sparrow Press)
 Mary Oppen (George Oppen's wife), Meaning a Life, a memoir (Black Sparrow Press)
 Adrienne Rich, The Dream of a Common Language
 Peter Seaton, Agreement (New York: Asylum's Press)
 Patti Smith, Babel
 William Stafford, Stories That Could Be True
 Mark Strand, The Late Hour, Canadian native living in and published in the United States
 Rosmarie Waldrop, The Road Is Everywhere or Stop This Body (Open Places)
 James Wright, To a Blossoming Pear Tree
 Louis Zukofsky:
 A (University of California Press)
 80 Flowers

Other in English 
 Jennifer Maiden, Birthstones, Angus & Robertson, Australia

Works in other languages 
Listed by language and often by nation where the work was first published and again by the poet's native land, if different; substantially revised works listed separately:

Arabic language 
 Nazir Qabbani, Syrian:
 I Love You, and the Rest is to Come
 To Beirut the Feminine, With My Love
 May You Be My Love For Another Year

French language

France 
 Noureddine Aba, Gazelle au petit matin, Algerian writer
 Yves Bonnefoy, Poèmes (1947–1975)
 Jean-Pierre Faye, Verres
 Jean Daive, Le cri-cerveau
 Philippe Denis, Revif
 Emmanuel Hocquard, Les Dernieres nouvelles de l'expédition sont datées du 15 février 17 [...]
 Edmond Jabès, Le Soupçon Le Désert
 Joyce Mansour, Faire Signe au machiniste
 Robert Marteau, Traité du blanc et des tientures
 Yves Martin, Je fais bouillir mon vin
 Claude Royet-Journoud, La Notion d'obstacle
 Jean Max Tixier, editor, Poètes de sud, anthology; publisher: Rijois
 Alain Veinstein, Vers l'absence de soutien

Canada 
 Marcel Bélanger:
 Fragments paniques
 Infranoir
 Normand de Bellefeuille, La Belle Conduite

German language

Germany 
 Alfred Andersch, Empōrt euch der Himmel ist blau
 Ingeborg Bachmann, works, in a four-volume edition
 Konrad Beyer, Gesamtwerk
 Nicolas Born, Gedichte 1967-1978
 Erich Fried, Die bunten Getûme
 J. Hans, U. Herms, and R. Thenior, Lyrik-Katalog Bundesrepublik, anthology
 Thomas Mann, Tagebücher 1933-1934
 Johannes Schenk, Zittern
 Kurt Tucholsky, Die Q-Tagebücher 1934-1935

Criticism, scholarship and biography in Germany 
 Walter Hinck, Von Heine zu Brecht. Lyrik im Geschichtsprozess (scholarship)
 Walter Hinderer, editor, Gesch. der politschen Lyrik in Deutschland, Stuttgart (scholarship)
 William H. Rey, Poesie der Antipoesie: Moderne deutsche Lyrik Genesis, Theorie, Struktur, Heidelberg,  (scholarship)

Hebrew language 
 D. Avidan, a poetry book
 P. Sadeh, a poetry book
 E. Megged, a poetry book
 M. Ben-Shaul, a poetry book
 Zelda (poet), a poetry book

India 
Listed in alphabetical order by first name:
 Buddhidhari Singha, Smrti-Sahasri, a kavya, Maithili-language
 Debarati Mitra, Jubaker Snan, Kolkata: Ananda Publishers, Kolkata; Bengali-language
 Dilip Chitre, Kavitenantarchya Kavita, Vacha Prakashan, Aurangabad; Marathi-language
 Jaya Mehta, Venetian Blind; Indian poet writing in Gujarati
 K. Satchidanandan, Indian Sketchukal ("Indian Sketches"); Malayalam-language
 K. Siva Reddy, Netra Dhanussu, Hyderabad: Jhari Poetry Circle, Telugu-language
 Nirendranath Chakravarti, Aaj Shokaaley, Kolkata: Ananda Publishers; Bengali-language
 Sitanshu Yashaschandra, Moe-n jo dado poems read on cassette; Gujarati-language
 Varavara Rao (better known as "VV"), Swechcha or Svecha ("Freedom"), Hyderabad: Yuga Prachuranalu; Telugu-language

Italy 
 Mario Luzi, Al Fuoco della controversia
 Leonardo Sinisgalli, Dimenticatoio
 Eugenio Montale, Tutte le poesie
 Franco Fortini, Una volta per sempre, poesie 1938-1973

Norway 
 Hans Børli, Dag og Drøm: Dikt i utvalg ("Day and Dream") (Norway)
 Paal Brekke, Dikt 1949-1722 (Norway)
 Halldis Moren Vesaas, Dikt i samling (Norway)

Poland 
 Stanisław Barańczak, Sztuczne oddychanie ("Artificial Respiration"), London: Aneks
 Ryszard Krynicki, Nasze zycie rośnie. Wiersze ("Our Life is Growing: Poems"); Paris: Instytut Literacki
 Ewa Lipska, Piaty wybor wierszy ("Fifth Collection of Verse"); Warsaw: Czytelnik
 Z. Jarosiński and H. Zawarska, editors, Antologia polskiego futuryzmu i Nowej Sztuki, anthology
 Adam Zagajewski, List ("A Letter"), Poznañ: Od Nowa

Portuguese language 
 Rui Knopfli, O Escriba Acocorado (Portugal)
 Waldimir Diniz, Até o 8° round (Brazilian)
 Cassiano Nunes, Madrugada (Brazilian)
 Accioly Lopes, his first volume of verse (Brazilian)

Spanish language

Spain 
 Eduardo Haro Ibars, Perdiddas blancas
 Féliz de Asúa, Pasar y siete canciones (he also published a novel this year, Les lecciones suspendidas)
 Luis Antonio de Villena, Viaje a Bizancio
 Pere Gimferrer, a collection of his verse translated from Catalan to Castilian by the author
 García Hortelano, editor, anthology of verse by the Generation of the '50s, including Caballero Bonald, Ángel González, Jaime Gil de Biedma, Carlos Barral

Latin America 
 Alfonso Calderón, Poemas para Clavecin ("Poems for Harpsichord"), Chile
 Arturo Corcuera, Los Amantes, Peru
 Oscar Hahn, Arte de morir
 Pablo Neruda (died 1973), Para nacer he nacido, previously unpublished diary entries, memoirs and other writings, put out by his widow, Matilde de Neruda and Miguel Otero Silva (of Venezuela)
 Luis Alberto Spinetta, Guitarra Negra (Black Guitar) - first edition of the only book written by the singer Luis Alberto Spinetta of Argentina.

Sweden 
 Tomas Tranströmer, Sanningsbarriāren
 Tobias Berggren, Bergsmusik
 Eva Runefelt, Aldriga och barnsliga trakter

Yiddish 
 Shoyme Roitman, a poetry book
 Rachel Boymvol, a poetry book
 Jacob Shargel, a poetry book
 Hayyim Plotkin, a poetry book

Other 
 Odysseus Elytis, Μαρία Νεφέλη ("Maria Nefeli"), Greece
 Joseph Brodsky, editor of two expatriate Russian poetry anthologies:
 Konets prekrasnoy epokh: Stikhotvoreniya 1964-71
 Chast' rechi: Stkikhotvoreniya 1972-76
 Klaus Høeck, Denmark:
 Skygger, publisher: Swing
 Topia eller Che Guevara
 Seán Ó Ríordáin, Tar éis mo Bháis ("After my Death"), Ireland
 Sjón, Sýnir ("Visions"), Iceland

Awards and honors

Canada 
 See 1978 Governor General's Awards for a complete list of winners and finalists for those awards.

United Kingdom 
 Cholmondeley Award: Christopher Hope, Leslie Norris, Peter Reading, D. M. Thomas, R. S. Thomas
 Eric Gregory Award: Ciaran Carson, Peter Denman, Christopher Reid, Paul Wilkins, Martyn A. Ford, James Sutherland-Smith

United States 
 AML Award for "Poetry Honorable Mention" Clinton F. Larson for "The Western World " and Marden J. Clark for "God's Plenty" and Marilyn McMeen Miller Brown for "Grandmother"
 Consultant in Poetry to the Library of Congress (later the post would be called "Poet Laureate Consultant in Poetry to the Library of Congress"): William Meredith appointed this year.
 National Book Award for Poetry: Howard Nemerov, The Collected Poems of Howard Nemerov
 Pulitzer Prize for Poetry: Howard Nemerov, The Collected Poems of Howard Nemerov
 Walt Whitman Award: Karen Snow, Wonders
 Fellowship of the Academy of American Poets: Josephine Miles

France 
 Guillaume Apollinaire prize: Jean-Claude Renard, La Lumière du silence

Other 
 Cuba: Casa de las Américas prize for poetry: Claribel Alegria of El Salvador, for Sobrevivo
 Soviet Union: USSR State Prize: Andrei Voznesensky

Births 
 June 7 – Jesse Ball, American poet and writer
 October 24 – Kei Miller, Jamaican-born poet and writer
 September 4 – Natalie Diaz, Mojave American poet, language activist, professional basketball player and educator
 Also
 Jen Hadfield, English poet and visual artist
 J. O. Morgan, Scottish poet

Deaths 
Birth years link to the corresponding "[year] in poetry" article:
 January 20 – Gilbert Highet, 71, Scottish-American classicist, academic, writer, intellectual, critic and literary historian, of cancer
 February 2 – G. Sankara Kurup, 76 (born 1901), Indian Malayalam-language poet
 February 22 – Phyllis McGinley, 72 (born 1905), American children's story writer and poet
 March 19 – Faith Baldwin, 84, American romantic novelist and poet
 March 22 – John Hall Wheelock, 91, American poet
 April 14 – F.R. Leavis, 82, English literary critic
 April 16 – Elizabeth Rebecca Ward, 97, English versifier
 May 1 – Sylvia Townsend Warner, 84, English novelist and poet
 May 12 – Louis Zukofsky, 74, American modernist poet
 July 2 – Aris Alexandrou, 56, Greek poet
 June 3 – Frank Stanford, 29, American poet, by suicide
 September 9 – Hugh MacDiarmid, 86, Scottish poet
 Also:
 Sankara Kurup (born 1901), Indian, Malayalam-language poet
 P. Kunhiraman Nair (born 1909), Indian, Malayalam-language poet
 J. Rodolfo Wilcock (born 1919), Argentine author and poet

Notes 

 Britannica Book of the Year 1979 ("for events of 1978"), published by Encyclopædia Britannica 1979 (source of many items in "Works published" section and rarely in other sections)

See also 

 Poetry
 List of poetry awards
 List of years in poetry

20th-century poetry
Poetry